Daunne Devi Temple is a Hindu temple of Durga located in, Nawalparasi district of Nepal. The temple lies in the hill pass at an elevation of 1033 m msl in route from Bardaghat to Dumkibas. The temple also has Shivalaya due to which the temple is visited by pilgrimages in the month of Shrawan. The temple is believed to be established by Jung Bahadur Rana.

The Daunne hill was called Trikut Parbat in ancient times. It was place where Valmiki came for meditation.  The place is also believed to be visited by Mayadevi, the mother Sakyamuni Buddha, for meditation.

The temple is maintained by user community since 2049 BS. The current temple was constructed in 2055 BS. In 2032 BS, archeological excavation discovered three inscriptions near the temple. Another survey in 2053 BS discovered ancient coins.

See also
Maula Kalika Temple
List of Hindu temples in Nepal

References

Hindu temples in Lumbini Province
Buildings and structures in Parasi District
Shiva temples in Nepal